Sir Israel Gollancz Prize  is awarded biannually by the British Academy in honour of Israel Gollancz, a founder member and its first secretary, since 1924. Originally named "Biennial Prize for English Literature" and renamed after Gollancz's death in 1930, the award was established on the initiative of Frida Mond. It is awarded to scholars of Old and Early English language and literature and history of the English language.

Winners

 1925: Joseph Wright
 1927: R. W. Chambers
 1929: Professor Allen Mawer
 1931: H. C. K. Wyld
 1933: C. T. Onions
 1935: Sir W. A. Craigie
 1937: C. S. Lewis
 1939: J. M. Manly
 1941: Karl Young
 1943–1950: No award
 1951: Dorothy Whitelock
 1953: Kenneth Sisam
 1955: Bruce Dickins
 1957: Florence Harmer
 1959: Neil Ker
 1963: George Kane
 1965: Albert Hugh Smith
 1969: Kenneth Cameron
 1971: Phyllis Hodgson
 1981: A. J. Aitken
 1985: Anne Hudson
 1987: Bruce Mitchell
 1989: Angus McIntosh
 1991: Anne Hudson
 1995: H. Leith Spencer
 1997: Fred Robinson
 1999: George Kane (2nd award)
 2001: Malcolm Godden and Peter Clemoes
 2003: Robert Lewis
 2005: Patrick P. O'Neill
 2007: William James Simpson
 2009: Michael Lapidge
 2011: Jill Mann
 2013: Leslie Lockett
 2015: Ralph Hanna
 2017: Helmut Gneuss
 2019: David Wallace "for his lifetime contribution into the study of Chaucer and Medieval English literature"
 2021: Richard Dance, Sara Pons-Sanz, and Brittany Schorn (The Gersum Project), "for its innovative contribution to the study of the etymology of Middle English"

See also
 Awards of the British Academy

References 

British literary awards
British Academy
Awards established in 1924
1924 establishments in the United Kingdom
Biennial events
Medieval studies